Antônio Carlos Gomes (July 11, 1836 in Campinas – September 16, 1896 in Belém) was the first New World composer whose work was accepted by Europe. He was the only non-European who was successful as an opera composer in Italy, during the "golden age of opera", contemporary to Verdi and Puccini and the first composer of non-European lineage to be accepted into the Classic tradition of music.

Younger than Verdi, yet older than Puccini, Carlos Gomes achieved his first major success in a time when the Italian audiences were eager for a new name to celebrate and Puccini had not yet officially started his career. After the successful premiere of Il Guarany, Gomes was considered the most promising new composer. Verdi said his work was an expression of "true musical genius". Liszt said that “it displays dense technical maturity, full of harmonic and orchestral maturity.”

Life

He was born in Campinas, Empire of Brazil, son of Maestro Manuel José Gomes and Fabiana Maria Jaguari Cardoso.

His childhood's musical tendencies were soon stimulated by his father and by his older brother, José Pedro de Sant'Ana Gomes, also a conductor. José Pedro was the most dedicated guide and adviser in his brother's artistic career. He convinced Antônio to visit the Court where he became a protégé of Emperor Dom Pedro II, who, being notoriously interested in the careers of Brazilian artists and intellectuals, made it possible for Antônio Carlos to study at the Musical Conservatory of Rio de Janeiro.

After having graduated with honours, Carlos produced his first opera, A noite do castelo (September 1861), which was a big success. Two years later, he repeated it with his second opera, Joana de Flandres, which was considered superior to the first. These two pieces convinced the Emperor to offer him a Royal scholarship to study in Italy in 1864. He studied in Milan at the local conservatory with Lauro Rossi and Alberto Mazzucato and completed in three years a course which was normally completed in four years, obtaining the title of Maestro Composer.

Interested in composing an opera which dealt with a truly Brazilian subject, Carlos Gomes chose as the theme of his next work the romance novel O Guarani, by Brazilian writer José de Alencar. The opera was given an Indian subject and setting and it premiered in May 1870 at the La Scala Theater in Milan as Il Guarany.

The success was enormous. Even the most strict musical critics compared the Brazilian musician to the great European maestros, such as Rossini and Verdi. The King of Italy, Victor Emmanuel II, decorated the creator of the opera, which was presented in all major European capitals. Before that year was over, Gomes returned to Brazil, where he organized the premiere of Il Guarany in Rio de Janeiro. The piece achieved the same success Gomes had seen in Italy.

Returning to Italy, Carlos Gomes married Adelina Peri, an Italian pianist he had met while studying in Milan.

He wrote the hymn Il saluto del Brasile for the centenary of American independence which was performed in Philadelphia, on July 19, 1876.

In 1883 the maestro traveled to Brazil, receiving homages in every city he visited. When he returned to Italy, he dedicated himself to the composition of an opera themed against slavery, inspired by the liberation struggle of black slaves in Brazil, which got the title of Lo schiavo. The composition, which had been suggested by a great friend of Antônio's, a black engineer named André Rebouças, only debuted several years later in 1889.

When the Brazilian republic was proclaimed in 1889, Carlos Gomes, who at this time was in Campinas, sailed once more to Italy. Faithful to the Brazilian monarchy and Dom Pedro II, Gomes refused the opportunity given to him by president Deodoro da Fonseca to compose the new Brazilian National Anthem. In the following years, he composed the opera Condor and the cantata Colombo, for the Columbus Festival (October 12, 1892), in celebration of the fourth centenary of the discovery of America.

Invited by the governor of the Brazilian province of Pará to direct the Musical Conservatory, the maestro traveled to the capital Belém, willing to take the position. However, shortly after arriving, Carlos Gomes, by then an elderly man in poor health, died on September 16, 1896. Besides his eight operas, he composed songs (3 books), choruses, and piano pieces.

Gallery

Many honours were given to conductor Carlos Gomes throughout Brazil and abroad where he ruled and made fame.

Antônio Carlos Gomes's operas

See List of works for the stage by Antônio Carlos Gomes

References

Baker's Biographical Dictionary of Musicians, 8th ed., s.v. "Antonio Carlos Gomes."
Brazilian National Library Virtual Archives
Score.ePartitura small Brazilian website with digitalized scores (PDF) by Carlos Gomes.

Bibliography

 Góes, Marcus: Carlos Gomes – A Força Indômita; Secult, Pará, 1996
 Kaufman: Annals of Italian Opera: Verdi and his Major Contemporaries; Garland Publishing, New York and London, 1990. (contains premiere casts and performance histories of the operas by Gomes)
 Vetro, Gaspare Nello: Antônio Carlos Gomes; Nuove Edizione, Milano, 1977
 Vetro, Gaspare Nello: Antônio Carlos Gomes Il Guarany, Parma, 1996
 Vetro, Gaspare Nello: A. Carlos Gomes Carteggi Italiani, Parma, 2002

External links

 
Free scores by Antonio Carlos Gomes at Musica Brasilis website
 

1836 births
1896 deaths
19th-century Brazilian male musicians
19th-century classical composers
Brazilian classical composers
Brazilian male composers
Brazilian monarchists
Brazilian opera composers
Male classical composers
Male opera composers
People from Campinas
Romantic composers

bpy:কার্লোস গোমেস